Sporta Aģentūras Stadions is a multi-use stadium in Rēzekne, Latvia.  It is currently used mostly for football matches and is the home stadium of SK Blāzma of the Virsliga. The stadium holds 3,000 people.

External links
 Stadium information

Buildings and structures in Rēzekne
Football venues in Latvia
SK Blāzma